Anakin is a masculine given name usually given in reference to the Star Wars character Darth Vader, a hero turned villain whose original name was Anakin Skywalker. The name was first used for five or more boys in the United States in 1995 and has been among the 1,000 most common names for American boys since 2014. In 2021, the year it was most popular for American boys, the name was ranked at No. 644 on the popularity chart and was used for 425 boys.

References

English given names invented by fiction writers